Dennis Alan Ross (born October 18, 1959) is an American businessman and politician who served in the United States House of Representatives from 2011 to 2019.  A Republican from Florida, his district was numbered as  during his first two years in Congress, and it was numbered as the  during his last six years in Congress.

In April 2018, Ross announced that he would retire from Congress, and not run for re-election in 2018.

Starting in 2018, Ross became a distinguished professor of political science at Southeastern University and launched the American Center for Political Leadership (ACPL) in the Jannetides College of Business and Entrepreneurial Leadership.

Early life, education, and business career 
Ross was born October 18, 1959 in  Lakeland, Florida, the youngest of five children born to Bill and Loyola Ross. He attended Catholic school for nine years before graduating at Lakeland Senior High School in 1977. After high school, he attended the University of Florida before transferring to Auburn University where he graduated in 1981 with a Bachelor of Science Degree in Organizational Management. He then graduated from Samford University's Cumberland School of Law in 1987.

Ross went to work in the newly developed micro-computer industry working for several companies. He went on to serve briefly as an Associate with the law firm of Holland & Knight and was in-house counsel to Walt Disney World.  Subsequent to his time at Disney, he opened up his own law firm, Ross Vecchio P.A., representing Business and Industry in Workers Compensation matters for over 20 years. As Ross was elected to Congress, his former firm was required to change its name to Vecchio, Carrier, Feldman and Johannessen.

Early political career 
Ross went on to work for a year as a legislative aide in St. Petersburg to State Senator Dennis Jones in 1982. He was elected Chairman of the Polk County Republican Executive Committee, and served until 1995. In 1996, he ran unsuccessfully for the State Senate, losing to incumbent Democratic State Senator Rick Dantzler. In 2000, he ran for the 63rd district of the Florida House of Representatives, vacated by Adam Putnam.

U.S. House of Representatives

Elections 
2010

Ross decided to run for Florida's 12th congressional district, vacated for retiring Adam Putnam, who decided to run for Florida Commissioner of Agriculture. In the Republican primary, Ross defeated John W. Lindsey, Jr. 69%–31%. In the general election, he defeated Democrat Lori Edwards, the Polk County Supervisor of Elections, TEA Party candidate Randy Wilkinson, a Polk County Commissioner, 48%–41%–11%. This was the second time Ross succeeded Putnam. It was only the third time that a Democrat had managed to get 40 percent of the vote in this district since Andy Ireland switched parties in 1984 in what was then the 10th District (it was renumbered as the 12th after the 1990 census).

In 2009 Ross signed a pledge sponsored by Americans for Prosperity promising to vote against any Global Warming legislation that would raise taxes.

2012

After redistricting, Ross' district was renumbered as the 15th District. No other candidate filed by the deadline, and he won re-election to a second term unopposed.

Committee assignments
 United States House Committee on Financial Services
 Subcommittee on Capital Markets and Government-Sponsored Enterprises
 Subcommittee on Oversight and Investigations

Caucus memberships
 Congressional Constitution Caucus
 Republican Study Committee
Congressional Western Caucus
United States Congressional International Conservation Caucus
U.S.-Japan Caucus

Political positions

Interest group ratings 
Ross had a "D" rating from marijuana legalization advocacy group NORML for his voting history regarding cannabis-related causes.

Ross had a 13% score from the Humane Society Legislative Fund for his voting history on animal rights issues.

As of 2017, Ross had an "A−" rating from the National Rifle Association.

Gun policy
Following the 2017 Las Vegas shooting, Ross signed a letter written to the Bureau of Alcohol, Tobacco, Firearms and Explosives urging them to reevaluate the legal status of bump stocks, though no action has been taken as of March 2018.

Of bump stocks, Ross said, "I believe in taking the important step to outlaw devices that make a firearm simulate an automatic firearm. I fully support the Second Amendment and the right to keep and bear arms—this is about consistent enforcement of the automatic weapons ban."

After the Stoneman Douglas High School shooting, Ross released a statement announcing his support for bipartisan measures, including increasing funding for background checks, as well support for H.R. 4909, the STOP School Violence Act of 2018, which has not been voted on as of March 2018. Ross said that the Act would "establish and support evidence-based programs to help school personnel, law enforcement, and students recognize the warning signs, develop effective threat assessments, and operate anonymous reporting programs."

Tax reform 

Ross voted in favor of the Tax Cuts and Jobs Act of 2017.

Immigration
Ross supported President Donald Trump's 2017 executive order to impose a temporary ban on entry to the U.S. to citizens of seven Muslim-majority countries, calling the controversial order a "long overdue" measure to "ensure our country is safe from radical Islamic jihadists."

Abortion 
Ross is opposed to abortion. He was in favor of banning federal health benefits from covering abortions, as well as any federal money being used to fund abortions, the latter unless the pregnancy is the result of rape or incest or if the mother's life is in danger. He co-sponsored the Sanctity of Human Life Act, which states that life begins at fertilization. He wants to stop Planned Parenthood from receiving federal funding.

After Congress 
After leaving office, he became involved in political reform efforts, including joining nine other former members of Congress to co-author a 2021 opinion editorial advocating reforms of Congress.

References

External links
 
 
 

|-

|-

1959 births
21st-century American politicians
Auburn University alumni
Cumberland School of Law alumni
Holland & Knight associates
Living people
Republican Party members of the United States House of Representatives from Florida
University of Florida alumni